Gustavo Alfredo Leite Gusinky is a Paraguayan businessman and politician.

Biography
Leite studied Business Administration at the University of California, Irvine (Major in Finance, Minor in Economics) and also at the Chapman University; he obtained a Master in International Marketing at the Scottish Marketing School, University of Strathclyde, in 1988.

Leite served as Planning Minister during the presidency of Raúl Cubas Grau (1998-1999).

On 15 August 2013 he was sworn in as Minister of Industry and Commerce of Paraguay in the cabinet of President Horacio Cartes.

References

University of California, Irvine alumni
Chapman University alumni
Alumni of the University of Strathclyde
Paraguayan businesspeople
Government ministers of Paraguay
Industry ministers
Trade ministers
Living people
Year of birth missing (living people)